The 2016 season was the 104th season of competitive soccer in the United States.

National teams

Men

Senior

Friendlies

World Cup qualifying

Fourth round

Fifth round

Copa América Centenario

Goalscorers
Goals are current as of November 15, 2016, after match against Costa Rica.

Managerial changes 
This is a list of changes of managers:

U-23

Olympic qualifying

U-20

Friendlies

2016 Dallas Cup

2016 U-20 Men's NTC Invitational

2016 Four Nations Tournament

U-19

Friendlies

Copa del Atlantico

2016 Slovakia Cup

33rd International U-20 Men's COTIF Tournament

Stevan-Vilotic Cele tournament

U-18

Friendlies

Vaclav Jezek Tournament

U-17

Friendlies

Aegean Cup

2016 Mondial Football De Montaigu

2016 AIFF Youth Cup India

2016 Torneo Naciones de Mexico

2016 Nike International Friendlies

U-16

Friendlies

2016 tournament delle nazioni

2016 Val-De-Marne Tournament

U-15

Friendlies

2016 International Festival

Four Team International Tournament

Futsal

2016 CONCACAF Futsal Championship qualification

Beach Soccer

2016 Beach Soccer Intercontinental Cup

Paralympic: 7-a-side

2016 Paralympic Games

Group B

Women

Senior

Friendlies

Olympic qualifying

SheBelieves Cup

2016 Summer Olympics

Group G

Quarter-final

Goalscorers
Goals are current as of November 13, 2016 after match against Romania.

U-23

Friendlies

Istria Cup

U-23 Nordic Tournament

U-20

Friendlies

2016 U-23 La Manga Tournament

2016 U-20 NTC Invitational

FIFA U-20 World Cup

Group C

U-19

Friendlies

U-18

Friendlies

2016 U-20 La Manga Tournament

2016 International Cup

U-17

Friendlies

U-17 Women's NTC Invitational

CONCACAF Women's U-17 Championship

Group B

2016 FIFA U-17 Women's World Cup

Group D

U-16

2016 delle Nazioni Tournament

U-15

2016 CONCACAF U-15 Championship

Group A

Club Competitions

Men's

League Competitions

Major League Soccer

Conference tables 

 Eastern Conference

 Western Conference

Overall table 
Note: the table below has no impact on playoff qualification and is used solely for determining host of the MLS Cup, certain CCL spots, the Supporters' Shield trophy, seeding in the 2017 Canadian Championship, and 2017 MLS draft. The conference tables are the sole determinant for teams qualifying for the playoffs.

MLS Playoffs

North American Soccer League

Spring Season

Fall Season

USL 

Eastern Conference

Western Conference

Cup Competitions

US Open Cup

Final

International Competitions

CONCACAF Competitions

2015–16 CONCACAF Champions League

Knockout stage

Quarter-finals 

|}

2016–17 CONCACAF Champions League

Group stage

Group B

Group C

Group F

Group H

Women's

League Competitions

National Women's Soccer League

Overall table

Women's Premier Soccer League

United Women's Soccer

Cup Competitions

USASA National Women's Open Cup

Final

Honors

Professional

Amateur

Notes

References
US Soccer Schedule
US Soccer Results
Concacaf

 
Seasons in American soccer